Moulana Abdullah Tari is a religious leader and official of the separatist Jammu and Kashmir Democratic Freedom Party, serving as the party's Acting Chairman during the imprisonment of the party's Chairman Shabir Ahmad Shah. He is a member of the All Parties Hurriyat Conference.

Born: 1939, Shopian

Grandfather: Mohammad Anwar Shopiani

References

Living people
Jammu and Kashmir politicians
Jammu and Kashmir Democratic Freedom Party politicians
Year of birth missing (living people)